Narradores de Javé (The Storytellers) is a 2003 Brazilian film by Eliane Caffé.

Plot 
A small poor community called Javé is under threat of being flooded by a new dam that is being built, and the only way to prevent this is to prove the town's historical value. As most of the inhabitants are illiterate, they have no choice but to ask for the help of Antônio Biá, a man who has been ostracized ever since it was discovered that he had sent out letters with lies about their reputations as a way to keep his job in Javé's seldom-used post office. He now has the task of documenting people's memories of how the city was founded, yet each inhabitant has their version of what happened.

Cast 

 José Dumont .... Antonio Biá
 Matheus Nachtergaele .... Souza
 Nélson Dantas .... Vicentino
 Rui Resende .... Vado
 Gero Camilo .... Firmino
 Luci Pereira .... Deodora / Mariardina
 Nelson Xavier .... Zaqueu
 Altair Lima .... Galdério
 Henrique Lisboa .... Cirilo
 Maurício Tizumba.... Samuel

External links 
 
 Narradores de Javé on Portuguese Wikipedia

Brazilian drama films
2003 films
2000s Portuguese-language films